Dr. Jonathan Pitney (October 2, 1797 – August 7, 1869), considered the Father of Atlantic City, New Jersey, was a physician who promoted Absecon Island as a healing seashore resort.

Biography
Born in Mendham Borough, New Jersey in October 29, 1797, he studied medicine at Columbia University under Valentine Mott. He moved to Absecon, New Jersey in 1819 and established his medical practice there. He was a delegate to the New Jersey Constitutional Convention in 1844 and was instrumental in lobbying for the construction of the Absecon Lighthouse in the aftermath of the Powhattan ship wreck
Pitney's main achievement was the promotion of Absecon Island as a shore  medical retreat, with the help of civil engineer Richard Osborne and well connected Richard Summers they devised the idea creating a large scale resort. In 1853 he presented Osborne's designs for the city to Philadelphia railroad investors, which led to the creation of the Camden and Atlantic Railroad which opened on July 4, 1854. Pitney further promoted the city by extolling the healing properties of salt water and ocean air. He died in his Absecon home on August 7, 1869.

References

1797 births
1889 deaths
Columbia University alumni
People from Absecon, New Jersey
 American city founders